Drilon is a given name and a surname. Notable persons with that name include:

Persons with the given name
Drilon Cenaj (born 1997), Kosovan footballer 
Drilon Hajrizi (born 1991), Kosovan basketball player
Drilon Ibrahimi (born 1988), Kosovan sports shooter
Drilon Musaj (born 1994), Kosovan football player
Drilon Paçarizi (born 1989), Albanian football player
Drilon Shala (born 1987), Finnish football player

Persons with the surname
 Ces Drilon (born 1961), Filipino television journalist
 Franklin Drilon (born 1945), Filipino politician
 Gabb Drilon (born 1984), Filipino actor

See also
 Drilon National Park, Pogradec, Albania
 Drin River, formerly known as Drilon

Albanian masculine given names